Joseph Daniel Davis (born December 6, 1987) is an American television sportscaster who serves as the play-by-play broadcast announcer for Los Angeles Dodgers telecasts on Spectrum SportsNet LA. He also calls national MLB, NFL, and college basketball telecasts for Fox Sports, and has broadcast other pro and college sports for various teams and networks during his career.

Early years
Davis grew up in Potterville, Michigan, and graduated from Beloit College in 2010 with a degree in communications and journalism.

Broadcasting career
Davis started his professional career calling football, basketball, baseball and hockey for ESPN and was formerly the voice of the Montgomery Biscuits. From 2010 to 2012, Davis called college football, basketball, and baseball for Comcast Sports Southeast and served as a studio host for the Baylor ISP Network for the Baylor Bears and called NCAA Division III football and basketball for D3Sports.com. He is one of the very few broadcasters who has announced Division I sports along with Division III sports as well. For one season, Joe was the lead voice of the 2009 Illinois High School Volleyball State Championships and was the manager of broadcasting and media as well as calling games for the Schaumburg Flyers. His past work includes Beloit College basketball (men's and women's) and baseball as well as fill-in work for the Loyola Ramblers men's volleyball and women's basketball. He also called Sun Belt football and basketball for the Sun Belt Network. In 2012, he worked college football for ESPN, including the memorable Texas A&M win over Louisiana Tech with Johnny Manziel.

Fox Sports, NFL Network and FS1
In July 2014, Davis was hired by Fox Sports, where he calls college football and basketball, plus Major League Baseball and select National Football League games for the network and FS1. Davis has handled Division Series broadcasts on Fox/FS1 and filled-in on Game 4 of the 2019 American League Championship Series while Joe Buck called Thursday Night Football the same evening. Davis also filled in on Game 7 of the 2020 National League Championship Series while Buck called an NFL on Fox game between the Tampa Bay Buccaneers the Green Bay Packers. Later that year, Davis replaced Mike Tirico on the NFL Network broadcast of a Saturday night game between the Carolina Panthers and the Green Bay Packers after Tirico was dispatched to fill-in for Al Michaels on NBC Sunday Night Football, and would fulfill the same role in 2021. Also in 2021, Davis filled-in on an NFL on Fox game between the Tampa Bay Buccaneers and the New Orleans Saints while Buck called Game 5 of the World Series between the Atlanta Braves and the Houston Astros. In 2022, Davis was named to replace Buck as the lead play-by-play announcer full time for MLB on Fox. Later that year, Davis was selected to be Fox’s new #2 play-by-play man for their NFL coverage, replacing Kevin Burkhardt, who became Buck’s replacement on their #1 NFL crew. He subsequently called Bryce Harper’s home run in game 5 of the NLCS in 2022.

Los Angeles Dodgers
In November 2015, Davis was hired by SportsNet LA to serve as an alternate play-by-play commentator for the Los Angeles Dodgers during the 2016 season. He split the play-by-play role with Charley Steiner for games that were not called by Vin Scully, who would be retiring as the team's television broadcaster at the end of the season. Davis subsequently became Scully's successor for the 2017 season, alongside Orel Hershiser on color. In interviews, Davis stated that he did not plan to entirely emulate Vin Scully's style, use his catchphrases, or be viewed as a "replacement" of him, arguing that one cannot "replace the greatest anyone of all time in anything". He did, however, state that he wanted to maintain Scully's focus upon storytelling as a reminder of the traits of Scully. In regard to his transition to the role, Davis explained that "hopefully, some have listened and at least learned to tolerate me. But for my comfort level, last year was very important, and having Orel in the booth has been the best part, and biggest reason, for this being an enjoyable experience so far, personally and professionally. I'm eternally grateful to him for how he has gone out of his way."

Personal life
Davis resides in South Pasadena, California, with his wife Libby and three children, Charlotte, Blake, and Theo. Theo's full given name is Theodore Orel, named in honor of Davis's colleague and friend, Orel Hershiser.

His brother, Sam A. Davis, is the cinematographer and co-producer of the film Period. End of Sentence., the winner of the Academy Award for Best Documentary (Short Subject) at the 91st Academy Awards.

Career timeline

2022-present: NFL Divisional playoff game, NFL Wild Card playoff game, World Series and All-Star Game play-by-play on Fox Sports
2020–2021: NFL Network Saturday Special play-by-play
2017–present: MLB Postseason for FS1 play-by-play (Division Series and Championship Series)
2016–present: Los Angeles Dodgers on Spectrum SportsNet LA play-by-play
2015–present: NFL on Fox play-by-play (#2 play-by-play since 2022)
2014–present: MLB on Fox play-by-play (#1 play-by-play since 2022)
2014–present: College football and basketball on Fox and FS1 play-by-play
2012–2014: College football, basketball, baseball, and hockey on ESPN play-by-play
2011–2012: College football, basketball, and baseball on Comcast Sports Southeast play-by-play
2010–2012: Montgomery Biscuits play-by-play 
2010–2011: Baylor ISP Network Studio Host
2007–2010: D3Sports.com football and basketball play-by-play
2009: Illinois State High School Volleyball State Championships play-by-play on IHSA TV
2009: Schaumburg Flyers manager of broadcasting & media and play-by-play
2009: Loyola Ramblers men's volleyball and women's volleyball fill-in play-by-play 
2006–2009 Beloit College baseball and basketball (men's and women's) play-by-play

References

External links
Fox Sports Bio
Los Angeles Times article

1987 births
Living people
American radio sports announcers
American television sports anchors
American television sports announcers
Beloit Buccaneers football players
College baseball announcers in the United States
College basketball announcers in the United States
College football announcers
College hockey announcers in the United States
High school basketball announcers in the United States
High school football announcers in the United States
Los Angeles Dodgers announcers
Major League Baseball broadcasters
Minor League Baseball broadcasters
National Football League announcers
People from Lansing, Michigan
Softball announcers
Volleyball commentators
Women's college basketball announcers in the United States